Stephan Groß (born 23 October 1953) is a German former professional footballer who played as a defender in the Bundesliga for Karlsruher SC.

Club career
In 1971, after joining the club at youth level, Groß made the step-up to the senior squad of hometown club VfR Mannheim. One year later, Groß signed for SV Südwest Ludwigshafen, staying at the club for two years, before making the move to SV Neckargerach in 1974. Groß stayed at Neckargerach for three years, leaving the club to re-sign for VfR Mannheim in 1977 for a season.

In 1978, Groß signed for 2. Bundesliga Süd club Karlsruher SC. In 1980, Groß was part of the Karlsruhe side that achieved promotion to the Bundesliga. Groß made 113 Bundesliga appearances at Karlsruher SC, scoring 30 times, including his only Bundesliga hat-trick, and only Karlsruhe hat-trick, on 16 December 1980 in a 3–1 win against Bayer Uerdingen.

In 1986, Groß moved to FV Weinheim in a player-coach role. During Groß's time at the club, Weinheim won the Oberliga Baden-Württemberg in 1988.

Coaching career
In 1989, following his spell at FV Weinheim, Groß was appointed manager of SV Sandhausen. Groß remained at Sandhausen until 1992, when he joined Kickers Offenbach as assistant manager to Hans-Jürgen Boysen.

In 2001, Groß became a youth coach at VfL Neckarau. In 2007, Neckarau youth players Pascal Groß, Manuel Gulde, Robin Szarka and Marco Terrazzino all moved to nearby professional club TSG 1899 Hoffenheim, as a direct result of Groß's coaching. In 2007, Groß joined Waldhof Mannheim as youth team manager, staying with the club until the end of the 2011–12 season.

In June 2013, Groß was appointed manager of VfR Mannheim. On 10 November 2013, Groß resigned from the club after a 4–2 loss to FC Heidenheim II.

Personal life
Groß is the father to current Brighton & Hove Albion midfielder Pascal Groß.

References

Living people
1953 births
Footballers from Mannheim
German footballers
Association football defenders
Association football midfielders
German football managers
VfR Mannheim players
Karlsruher SC players
Bundesliga players
2. Bundesliga players
Germany B international footballers
SV Sandhausen managers
VfR Mannheim managers
Association football coaches